Marian Pisarek (3 January 1912 – 29 April 1942), was a Polish fighter pilot, a flying ace of World War II, with 11 planes confirmed shot down and an additional three probable.

Biography
In 1939, he was a member of the Polish 141st Fighter Squadron, flying P-11C's. On the first day of the war, 1 September 1939, he shot down a German Henschel Hs 126. Next day, Pisarek downed - in error- a Polish P-23 "Karas" bomber. On 4 September, he shot down a Ju 87 "Stuka".

After evacuation through Romania, Pisarek arrived in France. After the French surrender, the Polish aviators flew to Oran, in French North Africa. Eventually, via Casablanca, several Polish pilots arrived in Great Britain to join the Royal Air Force.

In early August 1940, Lt. Marian Pisarek joined 303 "Kosciuszko" Squadron, and took part in the Battle of Britain. On 7 September 1940, after shooting down one Messerschmitt Bf 109, he was shot down and had to bail out.

In June 1941, Pisarek was posted to command number 308 "City of Krakow" Squadron. On 14 August 1941, Pisarek claimed a Bf 109F destroyed.

In April 1942, Pisarek was made Wing Commander of the 1st Polish Fighter Wing (consisting of No. 303, 316, and 317 Squadrons). A few days later the wing was attacked over Le Touquet/Boulogne by a formation of JG 26 Fw 190's. Squadron Leader Piotr Ozyra (of 317 Sqn) and Wing Commander Pisarek were shot down and killed. Pisarek was probably shot down by the Commander of II/JG 26, Htpm. Joachim Müncheberg.

Awards
 Gold Cross of the Virtuti Militari - posthumously 11 June 1945, Cross No. 00143 (previously awarded the Silver Cross - 17 Sep 1940, Cross No. 08830)
 Cross of Valour - four times
 Air Force Medal 1939-45 (Medal Lotniczy)
 Field Pilot Badge
 Distinguished Flying Cross (United Kingdom)

References
With Great Sacrifice and Bravery: The Career of Polish Ace Waclaw Lapkowski Pages 128–129. Glenn Knoblock (2004). Merriam Press.

Further reading
 Tadeusz Jerzy Krzystek, Anna Krzystek: Polskie Siły Powietrzne w Wielkiej Brytanii w latach 1940-1947 łącznie z Pomocniczą Lotniczą Służbą Kobiet (PLSK-WAAF). Sandomierz: Stratus, 2012, s. 455. 
 Piotr Sikora: Asy polskiego lotnictwa. Warszawa: Oficyna Wydawnicza Alma-Press. 2014, s. 188–193. 
 Józef Zieliński: Asy polskiego lotnictwa. Warszawa: Agencja lotnicza ALTAIR, 1994, s. 18. ISBN 83862172. 
 Józef Zieliński: Lotnicy polscy w Bitwie o Wielką Brytanię. Warszawa: Oficyna Wydawnicza MH, 2005, s. 167–168. 

1912 births
1942 deaths
Aviators killed by being shot down
Polish military personnel killed in World War II
Polish World War II flying aces
Recipients of the Gold Cross of the Virtuti Militari
Recipients of the Cross of Valour (Poland)
Recipients of the Air Force Medal
Recipients of the Distinguished Flying Cross (United Kingdom)
Royal Air Force officers
The Few